The following is an incomplete list of association football clubs based in Malawi.
For a complete list see :Category:Football clubs in Malawi

B
BE FORWARD Wanderers (Blantyre)
Blackpool FC (Lunzu)
Blantyre United
Blue Eagles FC (Lilongwe)
Bullets FC (Blantyre)

C
CIVO United (Lilongwe)
Chinamwali Stars (Zomba)

D
Dwangwa United (Nkhotakota)

E
Eagle Strikers (Mzuzu)
EPAC United (Lilongwe)
Escom United (Blantyre)

J
Juke Box FC (Mzuzu)

M
MAFCO (Salima)
Moyale Barracks (Mzuzu)
Mwanza Border Socials (Mwanza)
Mwanza Madrid (Mwanza)
Mwanza Academy FC (Mwanza)

N
Nkhata Bay United (Nkhata Bay)

R
Red Lions FC (Zomba)

S
Silver Strikers (Lilongwe)

T
Tigers FC (Blantyre)

Z
Zomba United (Zomba)

 
Malawi
Football clubs
Football clubs